Matthew Long may refer to:

Matthew Long (director), Canadian film writer, director, and producer
Matthew Long (firefighter), New York City firefighter who was severely injured in 2005
Matthew Long (rower), Australian Olympic-level rower
Matt Long, American actor